Rockson Bukari is a Ghanaian politician and a member of the New Patriotic Party in Ghana. He is the Upper East Regional minister of Ghana. He was appointed by President Nana Addo Danquah Akuffo-Addo in January 2017 and was approved by the Members of Parliament in February 2017.

References

New Patriotic Party politicians
People from Upper East Region
Year of birth missing (living people)